Magic Valley High School is an alternative high school in Twin Falls, Idaho.

References

Public high schools in Idaho
Alternative schools in the United States
Twin Falls, Idaho
Schools in Twin Falls County, Idaho
Educational institutions in the United States with year of establishment missing